Melisa is a genus of moths.

Melisa may also refer to:

 MELISA, a type of blood test

People
Melisa Akarsu (born 1993), Turkish swimmer
Melisa Arévalo (born 1980), Argentine tennis player
Melisa Aslı Pamuk (born 1991), Dutch-Turkish beauty pageant titleholder
Melisa Can (born 1984), U.S. born Turkish basketball player
Melai Cantiveros (born 1988), Filipina actress, comedian and host
Melisa Döngel (born 1999), Turkish actress and model
Melisa Ertürk (born 1993), Turkish-Canadian women's footballer
Melisa Filis (born 2002), English footballer
Melisa Franzen (born 1980), American politician
Melisa Gil (born 1984), Argentine sports shooter
Melisa Gretter (born 1993), Argentine basketball player
Melisa Güneş (born 2001), Turkish weightlifter
Melisa Hasanbegović (born 1995), Bosnian footballer
Melisa Kerman (born 1994), Turkish volleyball player
Melisa Matheus (born 1998), Namibian footballer
Melisa Michaels (1946–2019), American author
Melisa Miranda (born 1988), Chilean tennis player
Melisa Moses (born 1972), American diver
Melisa Murillo (born 1982), Colombian athlete
Melisa Nicolau (born 1984), Spanish footballer
Melisa Şenolsun (born 1996), Turkish actress
Melisa Sözen (born 1985), Turkish actress
Melisa Teo (born 1975), Singaporean photographer
Melisa Upu (born 1974), New Zealand softball player
Melisa Wallack (born 1968), American screenwriter and film director
Melisa Whiskey, British-Nigerian Afropop singer
Melisa Zhdrella, (born 2000), Kosovan swimmer

See also
 Melissa (disambiguation)
 Melise (disambiguation)